Herbert Run is a  stream that flows through Baltimore County. It is a tributary of the Patapsco River, which flows into the Chesapeake Bay.

Herbert Run divides into two tributaries, East Branch Herbert Run and West Branch Herbert Run, to the north. The headwaters of the East Branch are located near the Banneker Community Center in the neighborhood of Catonsville. The headwaters of the West Branch are located near Spring Grove Hospital Center in Catonsville.

See also
List of Maryland rivers

References

Rivers of Maryland
Patapsco River
Rivers of Baltimore County, Maryland